Aknepop is Eppu Normaali's first album released in May 1978. It was recorded 13–15 March 1978. Pertti Ström is a secret name of Epe Helenius. He used the name to write to Finnish music magazine Soundi.

Track listing
 Teen sinusta muusia (I'm Gonna Beat You into Pulp) 2.42
 Diggaan itseäni (I Dig Myself) 2.36
 James Dean (taas) (James Dean (Again)) 1.50
 Oi maa (Oh, This Land) 2.32
 Oppi tulee idästä (Doctrine Comes From the East) 2.16
 Kekkonen rock (Kekkonen Rock) 1.34 (Suomen Talvisota 1939-1940 cover)
 Poliisi pamputtaa ([the] Police beats [with a baton]) 1.52
 Poliisi pamputtaa taas ([the] Police beats [with truncheon] again) 1.52
 Rääväsuita ei haluta Suomeen (Loudmouths are not desired in Finland) 3.06
 Sotilaallinen tyhjiö (Militant Void) 3.40
 Kaljaa nuorille (Beer for the Youth) 2.54
 Suomi ryömii (Finland Crawls) 2.16
 Kuka ön Pertti Ström (Who is Pertti Ström?) 2.05
 (näin on) (so it is) 0.04

References

1978 debut albums
Eppu Normaali albums
Punk rock albums by Finnish artists
Finnish-language albums